The Futsal-Regionalliga Süd is the highest german futsal league. It consists of 10 teams and was introduced in the 2015-16 season with seven teams. The winner of each Futsal-Regionalliga takes part in the Deutsche Futsal-Meisterschaft to determine the German champion at the end of the season. The second-placed team has the chance to qualify for the Deutsche Futsal-Meisterschaft through a playoff round. The bottom teams of the Regionalliga are relegated directly or compete in a relegation playoff round. The Futsal-Regionalliga Süd is organised by the Southern German Football Association and includes the Federal States of Bavaria, Hessia and Baden-Wurttemberg.

Founding members of the Futsal-Regionalliga Süd 2015/16 
SV Darmstadt 98, Cosmos Hoechst, BaKi Futsal Nuremberg, Germania Ober-Roden, FC Portus Pforzheim, TV Wackersdorf, TSV Weilimdorf

Champions of the Futsal-Regionalliga Süd

Records

Player records 

As of 1 July 2019

Boris Radisavljevic is the league's record player with 63 caps only for TV Wackersdorf.
The top goalscorer is Josip Sesar with 98 goals only for TSV Weilimdorf.

Team records 

As of 1 July 2019

TSV Weilimdorf were crowned the first champions. The most league titles (3) have been won and the most wins (59) have been recorded by TSV Weilimdorf. SSV Jahn Regensburg and TSV Weilimdorf are the league's onlyest teams to end a season undefeated, have won the Deutsche Futsal-Meisterschaft and to qualify for the UEFA Futsal Champions League.

See also 
 Deutsche Futsal-Meisterschaft
 UEFA Futsal Champions League

References

External links

Futsal-Regionalliga Süd on FuPa.net 

Futsal leagues in Germany
Ger
Professional sports leagues in Germany